Save the Children is a child-welfare non-profit organisations founded in London in 1919.

Save the Children may also refer to:

 Save the Children International
 Save the Children USA

Music
"Save the Children" (song), first recorded on What's Going On by Marvin Gaye
Save the Children (album), a 1989 album by Bobby Womack, and its title track
Best Hits Live: Save the Children Speed Live 2003, a 2004 live album by Speed
"Save the Children", a song from Pieces of a Man by Gil Scott-Heron
"Save the Children", a song from B4.Da.$$ by Joey Badass 
"Save the Children", a song from My Tribute by Carola Häggkvist

Other 
 Save the Children (film), a 1973 documentary about the 1972 Operation PUSH exposition
 The last sentence of Lu Xun's short story A Madman's Diary
 A hashtag of the QAnon movement

See also
 The Flood: Who Will Save Our Children?, a 1993 U.S. television movie
 International Save the Children Union, a former Geneva-based international organisation of children's welfare organisations
 Operation Save Our Children, a 2011 U.S. operation against child pornography
 Save Our Children, a campaign against gay rights founded in 1977
 Save the German Children Society, an Irish aid group founded in 1946
 Save the Kids token, a 2021 cryptocurrency pump and dump scheme
 Think of the children